Mashour is an Arabic origin word. It has some variants, including Mashhour. It is used as a masculine given name and a surname. People with the name include:

Given name
 Mashour Haditha al-Jazy (1928–2001), Jordanian army general
 Mashhour Ahmed Mashhour (1918–2008), Egyptian engineer
 Mashour bin Abdulaziz Al Saud (born 1942), Saudi royal and businessman
 Mashour bin Saud Al Saud (1954–2004), Saudi royal

Surname
 Bassel Mashhour (born 1982), Egyptian water polo player
 George Mashour, American anesthesiologist
 Karam Mashour (born 1991), Arab-Israeli basketball player
 Salem Mashour (born 1940), Egyptian rower

Arabic-language surnames
Arabic words and phrases
Arabic masculine given names